The Mexican state of Zacatecas held an election on Sunday, 4 July 2004.
At stake was the office of the Zacatecas State Governor, all 30 members of the unicameral Zacatecas State Congress, and 57 mayors and municipal councils.

Turnout was in excess of 50% of the 935,548 zacatecanos eligible to vote.

Governor
At the time of the election, the sitting governor was Ricardo Monreal Ávila of the Party of the Democratic Revolution (PRD). 

At 22h30, with results from 46% of the polling stations counted, the victory of Amalia García, with a 35,000 vote lead, seemed inevitable.

State congress
18 first-past-the-post districts:
PRD leading in 15
PRI/Alliance leading in 3
12 proportional representation seats
calculation pending

Municipalities
Of the state's 57 municipalities:
PRD leading in 28 (including state capital Zacatecas, Fresnillo, and Guadalupe)
PRI leading in 12
PAN leading in 11 (including Jerez)
PT leading in 2
CD leading in 1

A.O.B.
In separate press conferences, all three of the other candidates said they did not recognize García's victory and would be challenging the result before the electoral courts.

On the same day
2004 Chihuahua state election
2004 Durango state election

See also
Politics of Mexico
List of political parties in Mexico

External links
Zacatecas State Electoral Institute

2004 elections in Mexico
Zacatecas elections
July 2004 events in Mexico